The Broad Street Apartments are buildings on Broad Street in Columbus, Ohio, in the King-Lincoln Bronzeville neighborhood. They are near the Columbus College of Art and Design (CCAD), along with the Columbus State Community College. The property is also part of the 18th & E. Broad Historic District of the Columbus Register of Historic Properties.

See also
 National Register of Historic Places listings in Columbus, Ohio

References

Apartment buildings in Ohio
National Register of Historic Places in Columbus, Ohio
Residential buildings on the National Register of Historic Places in Ohio
Columbus Register properties
King-Lincoln Bronzeville
Broad Street (Columbus, Ohio)